Steven Mark Bottomley (born 15 February 1965) is an English professional golfer.

Career
Bottomley spent eight seasons on the European Tour.  His best season was in 1995, due in large part to his finish at the 1995 Open, where he finished 64th on the money list.

1995 Open Championship
Bottomley's most notable finish was a tie for 3rd place at the 1995 Open Championship. Bottomley earned his spot at the Open by way of a qualifier. He was the only player to shoot below 70 in the final round and spent an hour as the clubhouse leader. Ultimately, he finished one stroke back of a playoff. The 1995 Open was held at Old Course at St Andrews and in his life Bottomley has only played six rounds at the Old Course, four of which being the rounds at the 1995 Open.

Professional wins (2)

Challenge Tour wins (1)

Other wins (1)

Results in major championships

Note: Bottomley only played in The Open Championship.

CUT = missed the half-way cut
"T" indicates a tie for a place

Team appearances
Amateur
European Youths' Team Championship (representing England): 1984

References

External links

English male golfers
European Tour golfers
Sportspeople from Bradford
People from Bingley
1965 births
Living people